Samsung Galaxy F52 5G is a mid-range Android smartphone manufactured by Samsung Electronics as part of the Galaxy F series. It is the first 5G-capable device in the Galaxy F series. It was announced in May 2021 in China and is the first phone in the Galaxy F series to be available in China.

Specifications

Design 
Samsung Galaxy F52 5G measures 164.6 x 76.3 x 8.7 mm and weighs 199 grams. It has a 6.6 inch display with a punch hole at the top right for the front-facing camera. Both the frame and the back panel are made of plastic. It has a side-mounted capacitive fingerprint reader that doubles as the power button and a volume rocker at the right, a hybrid dual SIM tray with one of the SIM slots that can be used as a microSD card slot at the left, and a 3.5 mm audio jack, a USB-C port and a microphone at the bottom. It is available in white and black.

Hardware 
Samsung Galaxy F52 5G is powered by the Qualcomm Snapdragon 750G system-on-chip with 8 nm process, an integrated 5G modem, an octa-core CPU consisting of a high-performance cluster with 2x 2.2  GHz Kryo 570 Gold (Cortex A77-based) cores and a high-efficiency cluster with 6x 1.8  GHz Kryo 570 Silver (Cortex A55-based) cores, and an Adreno 619 GPU. The SoC is paired with 8 GB RAM and 128 GB internal storage that can be expanded through the hybrid SIM/microSD card slot up to 1 TB. It has a quad rear camera setup with a 64 MP main camera, an 8 MP ultrawide camera, a 2 MP macro camera and a 2 MP depth sensor. There is a 16 MP front-facing camera located in the punch hole on the display. It has a 6.6 inch TFT LCD display with 1080x2408 pixels resolution, 20:9 aspect ratio, 400 ppi pixel density and 120 Hz refresh rate. It has a 4500 mAh non-removable battery with 25W fast charging support.

Software 
Samsung Galaxy F52 5G is shipped with Android 11 and One UI 3.1.

Release 
Samsung Galaxy F52 5G has only been released in China so far. It costs CNY1,999 ($310/€255) in China and is sold with 8 GB RAM and 128 GB internal storage.

References 

Samsung Galaxy
Mobile phones introduced in 2021
Android (operating system) devices
Samsung smartphones
Mobile phones with multiple rear cameras